William or Bill Rodgers may refer to:
William P. Rodgers, member of the 1859–1860 California State Assembly
William Ledyard Rodgers (1860–1944), American naval officer and historian
Bill Rodgers (infielder) (1887–1978), American baseball player with the Boston Red Sox
W. R. Rodgers (William Robert Rodgers, 1909–1969), Northern Irish poet, book reviewer and radio broadcaster
Bill Rodgers (outfielder) (1922–2002), American baseball player
Bill Rodgers, Baron Rodgers of Quarry Bank (born 1928), British politician
Bill Rodgers (runner) (born 1947), American marathon runner
William C. Rodgers (1965–2005), American environmental activist and owner of Catalyst Infoshop
William Rodgers (economist), American economist and professor of public policy

See also
Bill Rogers (disambiguation)
William Rogers (disambiguation)